Birkan Öksüz (born 19 March 1996) is a Turkish professional footballer who plays as a left back for Kastamonuspor 1966.

Professional career
Öksüz is a youth product of Antalyaspor, and made his league debut with them in a 2-1 Süper Lig loss to İstanbul Başakşehir F.K. on 17 January 2016.

References

External links
 
 
 

1996 births
Living people
People from İskenderun
Turkish footballers
Antalyaspor footballers
Süper Lig players
TFF Second League players
Association football fullbacks
Sportspeople from Hatay